Saint Eigron was a pre-congregational saint of medieval South Wales.

He was the brother of Saint Gwenafwy whom he travelled to Cornwall with, a brother to Gildas and a son of Caw of Strathclyde. He was the Patron Saint of Llanigon, Wales and founded a Church in Cernyw.

References

5th-century Welsh people
5th-century births
Roman Catholic monks
Welsh Roman Catholic saints
Medieval Welsh saints
Year of birth unknown
Year of death unknown